Abu Ali al-Hassan ibn Masud al-Yusi (1631–1691) was a Moroccan Sufi writer. He is considered to be the greatest Moroccan scholar of the seventeenth century and was a close associate of the first Alaouite sultan Rashid. Al-Yusi was born in a Berber tribe, the Ait Yusi, just north of Fes. He was married to Zahra bint Muhammad b. Musa al-Fasi. Al-Yusi left his native village on a very young age for a lifelong pilgrimage. He received his barakah from Sheikh Mohammed Ben Nasir of the tariqa Nasiriyya of Tamegroute, and studied and taught at the zawiyya of Dila with Mohammed al-Hajj ibn Abu Bakr al-Dila'i. 

Of his autobiography, Al-Fahrasa (literally: academic journey), only the introduction and first section have survived and these were, until recently, unpublished. His better known text Al-Muharat also contains many autobiographical passages. Both texts are remarkable for the author's frank discussions of childhood misdeeds, the pleasures of his conjugal sex life, and other intimate details of his personal life. Al-Yusi's Daliyya (poem of praise) of his Shaikh Muhammad b. Nasir al-Dari of the Zawiya Nasiriyya of Tamegroute, is famous both in Morocco and  West Africa.

Al-Yusi criticised the reign of the Alouite sultan Moulay Ismael. This criticism was expressed in 'open' letters, some of which remain today.

Al-Yusi is known because he founded the cult of the seven saints of Marrakech at the request of Moulay Ismael.

Bibliography

Al-Yusi, Rasa'il Abi 'Ali al Yusi (ed. by Fatima Khalil Qabli), 2 vol., Al Yusi's essays, 1981
Al-Yusi, Zahr Al-Akam, 3 vol., Proverbs and famous sayings of al-Yusi, 1981
Al-Yusi, Al-Muhadarat fi al Lugha wa al Adab, (ed. by Muhammad Hajji), Essays and reflections by Al Yusi, 1976
Al-Yusi, Mashrab al-amm wa-al-khass min kalimat al-ikhlas (Silsilat al-Amal al-kamilah lil-Imam al-Hasan al-Yusi fi al-fikr al-Islami)
Al-Yusi, Fahrasat Al-Yusi, The 'fahrasa' (academic journey) of Al-Yusi Al Hasan, 2004
Al-Faqih Abu 'Ali al Yusi Al-Mdaghri, a biography of al-Yusi, Abd al Kabir, 1989
Kenneth L. Honerkamp, "Al-Yusi, Abu al-Hassan b. Masud" in: J. Lowry and D. Stewart (ed.) Dictionary of Literary Biography, vol. Arabic Literary Culture 1350-1830, Detroit: Thomson Gale, 2007
Jacques Berque, Al-Yousi: Problèmes de la Culture Marocaine au 17e Siècle, Paris, 2001 (reprint of 1958)
Clifford Geertz, Islam Observed: religious development in Morocco and Indonesia,  University of Chicago Press, 1971, p. 29 - 35
H. Munson, Jr.,  "Geertz on Religion", Religion 16(1986): 19-32
 Abdelfattah Kilito, "Speaking to Princes: Al-Yusi and Mawlay Ismail." In the Shadow of the Sultan, ed. Rahma Bourqia and Susan Gilson Miller. Cambridge, MA: Harvard UP, 1999. pp. 30–46. (Translation of Abdelfattah Kilito, "Parler au prince: Al-Yousi et Mawlay Ismail.")
Paul Rabinow, Symbolic Domination: Cultural Form and Historical Change in Morocco, University of Chicago Press, 1975
Ernest Gellner, Muslim Society (chap. 10), Cambridge University Press, 1981.

Notes

External links
Kenneth l. Honerkamp, al-Hassan ibn Mas'ud al-Yusi, in Roger M. A. Allen, Joseph E. Lowry, Terri DeYoung, Devin J. Stewart, Essays in Arabic literary biography, Volume 2, Otto Harrassowitz Verlag, 2009, p. 410-428  Online Google books  (retrieved, January 4, 2011)
Fatima Ghoulaichi, Of Saints and Sharifian Kings in Morocco: Three Examples of Reimagining History through Reinventing King/Saint Relationship (thesis), 2005, Chapter II "Moulay Ismail and Lyusi: The politics of baraka and sharifism", p. 18-28 

Asharis
Moroccan Sufi writers
Moroccan letter writers
Moroccan travel writers
Moroccan autobiographers
1691 deaths
1631 births
People from Tamegroute
People from Marrakesh
17th-century Moroccan people
Berber scholars
Berber writers
17th-century Berber people